Hum (Serbian Cyrillic: Хум) is a mountain on the border of Serbia and Montenegro, between towns of Sjenica and Rožaje, on the eastern edge of Pešter plateau. Its highest peak Krstača has an elevation of 1,756 meters above sea level.

References

Mountains of Serbia
Mountains of Montenegro
Montenegro–Serbia border